Twin of Brothers is a 2004 Hong Kong television series based on the novel of the same Chinese title by Wong Yee. It was broadcast on TVB.

Plot
Wacky wannabe swordsmen Chong and Ling accidentally acquire the mysterious "Longevity Martial Arts", which is rumoured to be the key to a huge treasure. The target of numerous people who covet the treasure, the two friends adventure through China despite the danger. In their journey, Ling meets two girls from two opposing sects, while Chong falls for the sister of the future emperor of China. With their extraordinary experiences, will the two become heroes amidst the historical turbulence?

Cast
 Note: Some of the characters' names are in Cantonese romanisation.

Main Character

Raymond Lam as Kou Chong
Ron Ng as Tzui Zhi Ling
Tavia Yeung as Lee Sau Ling
Leila Tong as Szee Fei Hyun / Shek Ching Shuen
Nancy Wu as Wan Wan
Li Qian as Sung Yuk Chi

Support Characters

Christine Ng as Fu Guan Chek and Fu Guan Yu
Waise Lee as Yu Man Fa Kup
Joel Chan as Yu-man Chi-kap
Savio Tsang as Sek Ji Hin
Yvonne Yung as Zhu Yu Yan
Lau Kong as Lee Yun
Mark Kwok as Lee Kin Sing
Anthony Tang as Lee Yeun Gut
Derek Kwok as Hau Hei Pak / Shadow Assassin 
Mary Hon as Fan Ching Wai
Wilson Tsui as Lee Mut
Jimmy Au as Lee Cheng
Law Lok-lam as Sung Kuet
Rubyanne Choi  as Dung Sok Ne
Andy Dai as Yum Siu Ming
Chuen Yung Siu as Wong Yun Ying
Ellesmere Choi as Dok Gu Chak
 Ricky Wong as Yeung Gwong
Henry Lo as Bin But Fu
Newton Lai as Wong Sai Chung 
Johnson Yuen as Lee Sai Man
Guest Star

Hung Lit Chan as Fu Choi Lam
Gordon Liu as Lee Lee Seung

International broadcast
 Thailand - Aired on Channel 3 in early September 2004, dubbed as mạngkr khū̀ s̄ū̂ s̄ib thiṣ̄  ("มังกรคู่สู้สิบทิศ", literally: Double Dragons).

References

External links
Official web page
Twin of Brothers review

2004 Hong Kong television series debuts
2004 Hong Kong television series endings
TVB dramas
Hong Kong wuxia television series
Adaptations of works by Huang Yi
Television series set in the Tang dynasty
Television shows based on Chinese novels